The 11th IAAF World Half Marathon Championships was held on May 5, 2002 in the city of Brussels, Belgium. A total of 198 athletes, 123 men and 75 women, from 60 countries took part.
Detailed reports on the event and an appraisal of the results were given both
for the men's race and for the women's race.

Complete results were published for the men's race, for the women's race, for men's team, and for women's team.

Medallists

Race results

Men's

(1:03:08), but tested positive for EPO.

Women's

Team results

Men's

Women's

Participation
The participation of 198 athletes (123 men/75 women) from 60 countries is reported.

 (1)
 (1)
 (4)
 (10)
 (3)
 (2)
 (1)
 (3)
 (2)
 (1)
 (6)
 (3)
 (2)
 (1)
 (1)
 (3)
 (10)
 (1)
 (9)
 (3)
 (1)
 (1)
 (2)
 (8)
 (9)
 (4)
 (10)
 (3)
 (1)
 (2)
 (1)
 (2)
 (3)
 (1)
 (2)
 (2)
 (2)
 (2)
 (2)
 (2)
 (1)
 (4)
 (2)
 (5)
 (5)
 (5)
 (9)
 (6)
 (3)
 (2)
 (1)
 (4)
 (2)
 (3)
 (1)
 (10)
 (3)
 (1)
 (1)
 (3)

See also
2002 in athletics (track and field)

References

External links
Official website

IAAF World Half Marathon Championships
Half Marathon Championships
World Athletics Half Marathon Championships
International athletics competitions hosted by Belgium